The Third Eye Centre is the second compilation album by Belle and Sebastian, released on 26 August 2013. It assembles various B-Sides and rarities the band has released since its previous compilation album Push Barman to Open Old Wounds.

Track listing

Excluded tracks 
There are various tracks that didn't make the track listing, despite being released since Push Barman to Open Old Wounds. They include:

 "Your Cover's Blown" (non-remixed, from the "Books" EP)
 "Baby Jane" (Rod Stewart cover, from the 7" Vinyl version of "White Collar Boy")
 "Final Day" (Young Marble Giants cover, from the Stop Me If You Think You've Heard This One Before ... compilation)
 "Final Day" - slow version (Young Marble Giants cover, from the Japanese "Books" EP')
 "Whiskey in the Jar" (traditional Irish cover from "The Blues Are Still Blue" 7" vinyl single)
 "I'm a Cuckoo (Japanese version)" (from the Japanese "Books" EP')

 "Cassaco Marron" (from the Late Night Tales: Belle and Sebastian compilation)
 "Crash" (The Primitives cover, from the Late Night Tales: Belle and Sebastian 2 compilation)
 "Come on Sister (Tony Doogan mix)" (from the "Come On Sister" 12" vinyl)
 "I Didn't See It Coming (Cold Cave mix)" (from the "Come On Sister" 12" vinyl)
 "Are You Coming Over For Christmas?" (from the Christmas single, 2007)
 "The Monkeys are Breaking Out the Zoo" (from Colours are Brighter compilation)
 "Cover (Version)" (from the "Books" EP)

Charts

References

Belle and Sebastian compilation albums
2013 compilation albums